Ussurella is a monotypic beetle genus in the family Cerambycidae  described by Mikhail Leontievich Danilevsky in 1997. Its only species, Ussurella napolovi, was first described by the same author two years earlier in the genus Ussuria, but that genus name was preoccupied by an ammonite.

References

Desmiphorini
Beetles described in 1995